A View of the World can refer to

View of the World from 9th Avenue, an iconic cartoon by Saul Steinberg 
A View of the World, selected travel writings by Norman Lewis